Timothy Brendan Murphy (1921 – 8 July 2005) was an Irish Gaelic football player and administrator who played for club side Bere Island, divisional side Beara and at inter-county level with the Cork senior football team.

Career

Murphy first played Gaelic football with Bere Island, winning several divisional championships before claiming a County Junior Championship title in 1943. He was a regular member of the Beara divisional team from 1942 until 1959, lining out in almost every position including goalkeeper. Murphy was drafted onto the Cork senior football team in 1945 and was an unused substitute when Cork claimed the All-Ireland title after a defeat of Cavan in the final. His older brother "Weesh" Murphy was full-back on the same team. In 1946 Murphy lined out with the Cork junior team before again being an unused substitute with the Cork senior team. As an administrator, he was treasurer of the Beara GAA Board in 1947; registrar from 1955 and chairman from 1958 until 1964. Murphy served as president of the Beara Board from 1990 until 2005.

Honours

Bere Island
Cork Junior Football Championship: 1943
Beara Junior Football Championship: 1939, 1941, 1942

Cork
All-Ireland Senior Football Championship: 1945
Munster Senior Football Championship: 1945

References

1921 births
2005 deaths
Bere Island Gaelic footballers
Beara Gaelic footballers
Cork inter-county Gaelic footballers
Gaelic games administrators